Harry Potter: Quidditch World Cup is a 2003 sports action video game that features the fictional sport of Quidditch from the Harry Potter franchise. The game was developed by two teams, EA UK and Magic Pockets, and was published by Electronic Arts. It was released for Game Boy Advance, Microsoft Windows, PlayStation 2, Xbox, and GameCube. The game bears no relation to the abandoned Nintendo 64 project.

Characters/Teams
Hogwarts House team rosters are based on Harry's third year (Prisoner of Azkaban). Other House and national team members not named in the books are named in this game, and their names are also listed on Chocolate Frog cards in the Half-Blood Prince video game.

As in the first three books, Lee Jordan returns as play-by-play commentator for the House Quidditch Cup matches, but unique to this game, Harry and Ron's dorm-mate Seamus Finnegan joins as color commentator. Meanwhile, Ludo Bagman returns as play-by-play commentator for international matches, with a set of color commentators. Other characters make appearances in the stands and elsewhere, such as Hermione Granger, Ron Weasley, Rolanda Hooch and Albus Dumbledore.

Gameplay

Hogwarts
In this stage, the player competes for the Hogwarts Inter-House Quidditch Cup for one of the Hogwarts house teams – Gryffindor, Ravenclaw, Hufflepuff, or Slytherin. Each House team is represented by its Seeker, and each Seeker is a specific character from the books (Harry Potter for Gryffindor, Draco Malfoy for Slytherin, Cedric Diggory for Hufflepuff, and Cho Chang for Ravenclaw). When the player chooses a team, the Seeker of the chosen House flies off on a broomstick. If this is the player's first time playing a team, the character will give a short statement praising the player's selection, then the house challenges appear. These challenges focus on specific areas of a full Quidditch game and are used to learn the game for new players, or polish skills as a returning player.

There are six House challenges: Passing, Tackle and Shoot, Seeker, Beaters and Bludgers, Special Moves, and Combos. Each is led by a relevant player – for example, Harry leads the Gryffindor Seeker challenge, while Angelina Johnson leads the Gryffindor Passing challenge and Oliver Wood leads the Gryffindor Combo challenge. Only the first three challenges - Passing, Tackle and Shoot, and Seeker - are initially available to the player, with Beaters and Bludgers, and Special Moves unlocked after the first Quidditch match, and Combos unlocked after the second match. Completing the first set of challenges unlocks the ability to play a full Quidditch match. Winning the first game chosen unlocks the next set of challenges which must then be completed to unlock the next match. Winning the second game unlocks the final challenge. Completing that challenge unlocks the Hogwarts Quidditch Cup final match.

During a Quidditch match, the player controls the Chasers who try and score goals with the Quaffle to earn 10 points per goal. The Chasers' abilities depend on which challenges have been completed, e.g. special moves and combo moves are unavailable in the first game. New abilities can also be unlocked by collecting certain Quidditch cards. These cards are earned by completing certain tasks, such as winning without conceding a goal or performing a certain number of steals in a game. Along the top of the screen, each team's score display also features a thin bar with one half of the Golden Snitch. Actions performed in game by the Chasers such as any successful pass increase the bar slightly, and performing a successful string of combo passes and shots can increase the bar by an amount proportional to the length of the combo string, up to seven actions. The player can continue to chain actions to the combo but the counter will not go past 7. The bar will increase until both halves join.

The Chasers can also perform moves to drain the opposing team's bar such as successfully hitting the opposing chasers with a Bludger, performing a successful Special Move tackle, or performing a Team Special Move. Every team in the game has a unique Team Special Move that triggers a short cinematic of spectacular teamwork between the team Chasers (and sometimes Beaters) and has a possibility of scoring multiple goals. For example, The Ravenclaw Team Special Move, the Burdish of Raven, scores three times for 30 points total – something no other Team Special Move, even those of the national teams, does. Although the original Quidditch rule disallows having more than 2 chasers in the scoring area at the same time (known as Stooging, as stated in Quidditch Through the Ages), doing such behaviour in this game will not result in penalty.

Once both halves of the Snitch join, the game moves into the Snitch Chase, regardless of score (it is possible, though unlikely, to engage in the Snitch Chase with the score at 0-0). During the Snitch Chase, the player now controls the Seeker and follows the Snitch, in a race against the opposing Seeker to catch it. The player can use a speed boost which drains a boost bar directly proportional to the size of the snitch bar accumulated during the Chaser portion of the game. Staying in the Snitch's slipstream helps refill the player's boost bar, and will cause the bar to extend its size if the bar is full. Using the boost, the player will be able to grab the Snitch once it is close enough. Successfully catching the Snitch grants the player's team 150 points and the match ends. This typically wins the match, but is not always the case, though catching the Snitch is also useful for catching up with the opposing team in points. The Cup is based on points, not wins, so high-scoring teams have a better chance at winning, and the team with the highest point total after all three games have been played wins the Cup. Winning the Cup with any team unlocks the Quidditch World Cup.

World Cup
The World Cup stage is similar to the Hogwarts stage in terms of gameplay, with the exception that there are no challenges available to the player and the teams are the national teams based on real countries instead of Hogwarts houses. Several different team choices are available to the player including England, the United States of America, Japan, Germany, France, Australia, the Nordic Team, Spain, and Bulgaria; the latter of which features the 'star seeker' from the book series, Viktor Krum. However, Bulgaria has to be unlocked first by collecting Quidditch cards.

Apart from team selection, the key difference between the World Cup and the Hogwarts Cup is that the player is required to choose what model of broom to use, which is essentially a Difficulty selection screen. The four models available are Comet 260 (Easy), Nimbus 2000 (Medium), Nimbus 2001 (Hard) and Firebolt (Very Hard). Only Comet 260 and Nimbus 2000 are available in the beginning; the others have to be unlocked by collecting Quidditch cards. Each broom offers different handling in-game, although this is hardly noticeable. The broom selection more directly affects how hard the AI will play.

The player will play against every team in the World Cup twice, once at the player team's home ground and once at the opposing team's. The Cup is awarded the same way as the Hogwarts Cup, so the team with the highest score total at the end of the season wins the World Cup. The player can play multiple separate World Cups with different teams simultaneously, but can only run one World Cup with any given team. For example, the player can play a World Cup as England and a separate World Cup as France at the same time, but cannot play two separate World Cups as France at the same time.

Exhibition
Exhibition allows the player to play a one-off match between the Hogwarts house teams at Hogwarts during summer or winter. The player can also choose to play an international match, controlling a national team. Only the venues of the England and US teams are available initially, but as the player wins against international teams in an 'away' game in the international tournament, more venues are unlocked. This mode also offers the game's multiplayer option. The team that the second player can choose depends on the team pool that the first player selects. In either single or multiplayer, a Hogwarts team cannot play against a world cup team or on any international field, and no world cup team can play at Hogwarts.

Reception

The game received mixed to positive reviews. GameRankings gave the game a score of 70% for the GameCube version, 71% for the PC version, 70% for the PlayStation 2 version, 69% for the Xbox version, and 53% for the Game Boy Advance version. Likewise, Metacritic gave it a score of 68 out of 100 each for the GameCube and PS2 versions, 69 out of 100 each for the PC and Xbox versions, and 53 out of 100 for the GBA version.

GameSpot gave all versions of the game except the Game Boy Advance version a rating of 6.5/10, citing sluggish controls and shallow gameplay, but praising the inclusion of easily recognizable characters from the books and films, and good graphics. IGN gave all console versions of the game except the Game Boy Advance version a 7.2/10 and GameSpy gave the PC version a score of three stars out of five. In Japan, Famitsu gave the GBA version a score of two sixes, one five, and one eight, for a total of 25 out of 40.

The game's critics generally criticized the game's feel, as the controls were felt to be sluggish. IGN cited the game as being "fun, but not compelling." Eurogamer cited the game commentary track as being "painful at times", but also described "Quidditch World Cup above [as] being an average, if well-implemented, fantasy sports game."

References

External links

 
 

2003 video games
Electronic Arts games
Magic Pockets games
Fantasy sports video games
Game Boy Advance games
GameCube games
PlayStation 2 games
Windows games
Xbox games
Harry Potter video games
Quidditch
Video games developed in the United Kingdom
Video games scored by Jeremy Soule
Video games set in Australia
Video games set in Bulgaria
Video games set in England
Video games set in France
Video games set in Germany
Video games set in Japan
Video games set in New England
Video games set in Northern Europe
Video games set in Scotland
Video games set in Spain
Multiplayer and single-player video games